Kerseymere is a fine woolen cloth with a fancy twill weave.  In printing fine work during the mid-19th century, the blankets that lay between the tympans were either fine kerseymere or superfine woolen cloth.

References 

Woven fabrics